Eirene or Irene was an ancient Greek artist described by Pliny the Elder in the 1st century. She was the daughter of a painter, and created an image of a girl that was housed at Eleusis.

One of the six female artists of antiquity mentioned in Pliny the Elder's Natural History (XL.147-148) in A.D. 77: Timarete, Irene, Calypso, Aristarete, Iaia, Olympias.

During the Renaissance, Giovanni Boccaccio, a 14th-century humanist, included Eirene in De mulieribus claris (Latin for On Famous Women). Some of the paintings he credits to Eirene are an older Calypso, the gladiator Theodorus and Alcisthenes, a famous dancer.

See also
 Women artists

Sources

References
Pliny the Elder. Naturalis historia, XXXV.40.140, 147.
Harris, Anne Sutherland and Linda Nochlin. Women Artists: 1550-1950. Los Angeles County Museum of Art, Knopf, New York, 1976.

Ancient Greek women artists
Ancient Greek painters
Greek women painters
1st-century BC Greek women
1st-century BC painters